Sandusky is an unincorporated community in Alexander County, Illinois, United States. Sandusky is located along Illinois Route 127, south of Tamms. Its elevation is 341 feet and is in the Central Time Zone.

Education
It is in the Egyptian School District.

References

Unincorporated communities in Alexander County, Illinois
Unincorporated communities in Illinois
Cape Girardeau–Jackson metropolitan area